Arthur Hornblow Jr. (March 15, 1893 – July 17, 1976) was an American film producer.

Biography
Hornblow was the son of Arthur Hornblow Sr. (1865–1942), a writer who edited Theatre Magazine in New York City.

Hornblow graduated from DeWitt Clinton High School, New York City, in 1911, before studying at Dartmouth College and New York Law School,  and was a member of the fraternity Theta Delta Chi. He served in counter-intelligence during World War I, and then tried his hand at playwriting. He was then hired as a production supervisor by Sam Goldwyn at Paramount in 1927.

Initially, he specialized in the popular screwball comedies, eventually giving Billy Wilder his first directing job, and producing several films starring Bob Hope.   These included The Cat and the Canary (1939), The Ghost Breakers (1940) and Nothing But the Truth (1941).  In 1942 he moved to MGM where he produced Gaslight and several film noir. In the 1950s, now an independent producer rather than a studio employee, he worked on the musical Oklahoma and the courtroom drama Witness for the Prosecution, directed by his former Paramount colleague, Billy Wilder.

He gave aspiring actress Marie Windsor her first screen test, and Constance Ockelman her new name, Veronica Lake.

Oscar nominations
As a producer he was nominated for an Academy Award 'Best Picture' Oscar four times, but failed to win.

 Ruggles of Red Gap (1935), comedy-western with Charles Laughton.
 Hold Back the Dawn (1941), romantic-comedy with Charles Boyer and Olivia de Havilland.
 Gaslight (1944), thriller with Ingrid Bergman, Charles Boyer and Joseph Cotten.
 Witness for the Prosecution (1957), courtroom drama with Charles Laughton, Tyrone Power, Marlene Dietrich, and Elsa Lanchester.

Remembrance 
He allowed a version of his last name be used by C. S. Forester (who, together with Niven Busch, was a scriptwriter for one of the films he directed) for the fictional sea captain Horatio Hornblower.

Selected filmography

 Four Hours to Kill! (1935)
 The Princess Comes Across (1936)
 Easy Living (1937)
 High, Wide, and Handsome (1937)
 Midnight (1939)
 The Cat and the Canary (1939)
 The Ghost Breakers (1940)
 Arise, My Love (1940)
 The Major and the Minor (1942)
 Gaslight (1944)
 Desire Me (1947) 
 The Hucksters (1947) 
 Cass Timberlane (1947 film)
 The Asphalt Jungle (1950) 
 Million Dollar Mermaid (1952)
 Oklahoma! (1955) 
 The War Lover (1962)

Books by Arthur and Leonora Hornblow

 Animals Do the Strangest Things, illus. Michael K. Frith (Random House, 1964), 62 pp., 
The Hornblows, Frith, and Random House collaborated to produce numerous sequels, Birds Do the Strangest Things (1965), and so on.

Books by Arthur Hornblow

 A History of the Theatre in America From its Beginnings to the Present Time Vol. 1 (J.B. Lippincott Company, 1919), 
 A History of the Theatre in America From its Beginnings to the Present Time Vol. 2 (J.B. LIppincott Company, 1919),

References

External links

 (U.S. only)

 ; 
 ; 

1893 births
1976 deaths
Film producers from New York (state)
Children's non-fiction writers
Dartmouth College alumni
DeWitt Clinton High School alumni
New York Law School alumni